Zooey is a given name. Those bearing the name include:

Zooey Deschanel, an American actress and singer named after the Salinger novel. (She pronounces it as "Zoë.")
Zooey Perry, British handballer

In fiction 
 Zooey Glass, male Jewish-Irish character in Franny and Zooey and other parts of the Glass family narrative of J. D. Salinger 
 Zooey, truck (anthropomorphized as female child) in Bigfoot Presents: Meteor and the Mighty Monster Trucks
 Princess Zooey, a character in Sofia the First
 Zooey, an anthropomorphic fox in Sonic Boom (TV series)
Zooey Deschanel

See also
Zooey Magazine, defunct American quarterly

References